"My Angel Baby" is a 1978 song by Toby Beau.  "My Angel Baby" was written by band members Danny McKenna and Balde Silva.  The single, from the group's self-titled album, went to #1 on the Easy Listening chart for one week, and  peaked at #13 on the Billboard Hot 100.  "My Angel Baby" was the group's only Top 40 single.

In Canada, the song spent four weeks at #12.
"My Angel Baby" was a bigger Adult Contemporary hit, reaching the Top 10 in both nations.

Chart history

Weekly charts

Year-end charts

References

1978 singles
1978 songs
RCA Records singles
Pop ballads
Rock ballads